Maria Ruud (born 1961) is a Minnesota politician and a former member of the Minnesota House of Representatives who represented District 42A, which includes portions of western Hennepin County in the Twin Cities metropolitan area.

A Democrat, Ruud was first elected in 2004 when she narrowly defeated incumbent Rep. Peter H. Adolphson. She was re-elected in 2006 and 2008, but was unseated by just 107 votes by Republican Kirk Stensrud in the 2010 general election.

Ruud served as vice chair of the Energy Finance and Policy Division Committee, and was a member of the Education Finance and Economic Competitiveness Finance Division, the Health and Human Services, the Health Care and Human Services Finance Division, and the Mental Health Division committees.

Ruud is an Obstetrician-Gynecologist Nurse Practitioner at Park Nicollet Health Services in Brooklyn Center. She graduated from Bloomington Jefferson High School in Bloomington, then went on to the University of Minnesota, receiving her B.S.N. She later earned her M.S.N. at the University of California, San Francisco.

References

External links 

1961 births
Living people
University of Minnesota School of Nursing alumni
People from Minnetonka, Minnesota
Democratic Party members of the Minnesota House of Representatives
Women state legislators in Minnesota
21st-century American politicians
21st-century American women politicians
University of California, San Francisco alumni